Lloyd Dobler Effect was a Silver Spring, Maryland-based band formed in 1995 by Phil Kominski and Scott Shaw after departing their high school band, STUFF.  They brought in drummer Donnie Williams and the name "Lloyd Dobler Effect". The band performed alternative rock music, which at times featured Latin rhythms, vocal harmonies and go-go percussive beats. The band was named after John Cusack’s character in the Cameron Crowe film Say Anything..  In 2019, Lloyd Dobler Effect broke up.  Fans of the band can now see THE BREAKAWAYS or PHIL KOMINSKI SOLO:  The Breakaways (featuring Lloyd Dobler Effect lead vocalist, guitarist and song writer PHIL KOMINSKI, as well as past Lloyd Dobler Effect members) and Phil Kominski's Solo Project.  

The band performed in more than 15 countries, 37 states and at over 300 college campuses.  Between 2004 and 2012, the band performed over 250 gigs a year, often playing two per day in the summer. The band has headlined three tours for the Armed Forces Entertainment, including trips to the Middle East and Asia. In 2002, they won the WHFS BIG BREAK COMPETITION to open the main stage at the 2002 HFSTIVAL.  In 2002, the band won the Kahunaville Battle of the Bands to open the main stage at THE MOLSON SNOW JAM in Boston, MA.  In 2003, the band opened for the Goo Goo Dolls.  In 2005, the band signed with Gary Katz (Producer of Steely Dan) and Camille Barbone's (Manager of Madonna) record label, WINE DARK RECORDS.  Phil Kominski has been a sponsored artists of ELIXIR GUITAR STRINGS since 2003.  In November 2007 they won a Boru Vodka-sponsored, Battle of the Bands, which resulted in a sponsorship with the spirits Castle Brands Company.  In 2010, the band signed with Bob Winegard's record label, IMAGEN RECORDS.

Artists that Lloyd Dobler Effect has shared the stage with as tour support or one-off openers include:  Eminem, The Goo Goo Dolls, Jack Johnson, Better Than Ezra, Good Charlotte, Simple Plan, Sum 41, Dashboard Confessional, Carbon Leaf, Red Jump Suit Apparatus, Grouplove, The Pat McGee Band, Vertical Horizon, Kansas, Keller Williams, Galactic, Third Eye Blind, The Strokes, Jeffrey Gaines, Edwin McCain, Pat Green, Rock Kills Kid, Hot Chelle Rae, The Samples, Colin Hay, Hoobastank, Paul Oakenfold, Our Lady Peace, N.E.R.D., Goldfinger, Papa Roach, New Found Glory, P.O.D., Switchfoot, Audioslave, Jane's Addiction, The Roots, Godsmack, The Avett Brothers, Flogging Molly, Jimmie's Chicken Shack, Gin Blossoms, Clutch, Kay Hanley, Steve Winwood, Santata, The Mighty Mighty Bosstones, Unwritten Law, The Dropkick Murphys and The Fray.

Past Band Members
 Phil Kominski: Electric Guitar, Acoustic Guitar, Lead Vocals.  1995 - 2019.
 Donnie Williams: Drums and Percussion.  1995 - 2019.
 Chris Bruno: Electric Guitar, Mandolin, Vocals.  2004 - 2019.
 Javi Godinez: Violin, Vocals.  2000 - 2003.
 Rusty Williams:  Auxiliary percussion, Congas and Bongos, Vocals.  1999 - 2010.
 Carlos Nalda: Auxiliary percussion,Congas and Bongos.  2010 - 2019.
 Patrick Hughes: Bass and Vocals.  2006 - 2019.
 Elizabeth Coyle Kominski: Vocals.  2002 - 2019.
 Rod Godinez: Bass and Vocals.  2000 - 2004.
 Kevin MacIntyre: Bass and Vocals.  1997 - 1999.
 Albert Ketler: Tenor Saxophone.  1995 - 2019.
 Doug Rock: Saxophone.  2003 - 2006.
 Scott Shaw: Bass and Vocals.  1995 - 1997.
 Johnny Castro: Bass.  2005 - 2006.
 Shane Gamble: Bass.  2004.
 Brian Buracker: Bass.  2004.
 David Wilmot: Bass.  1999 - 2000.
 Hope Isesele: Bass and Vocals.  1999 - 2000.
 Janelle Ragno: Cello.  1996 - 1998.
 Keith Ghion: Saxophone.  1996.
 John Reef: Keyboards.  1997.
 Russ Kaplan: Keyboards.  1997.
 Christian J. Schoenewald: Keyboards.  1999 - 2000.
 Katie Walsh: Keyboards and Vocals.  1997.
 Jacob Teichroew: Saxophone.  2000 - 2001.
 Colin Watson: Saxophone.  1999.
 Earl Miller: Keyboards.  1999 - 2000.
 Chuck Espinoza: Bass.  2004.
 Hank Upton: Bass.  2004.
 Josh Frizzel:  Auxiliary percussion, Congas and Bongos, Vocals.  1996.
 Chris Brooks: Keyboards.  2009 - 2019.
 Brandon Van Epps: Saxophone.  1999.

Albums
 The Sloth Cassette (1996)
 The Horizontal E.P. (1996)
 Drift (1998)
 The Hit & Run Studio Demos (1999)
 Ecstasy Sold Here (2001)
 The Mossman Sessions (2002)
 Ten Bucks And A Coke - Live (2003)
 Left Footprints (2003)
 Live 2004 (2004)
 Gary Katz Sessions (2005)
 Candles (2008)
 The Experience Unplugged (2010)
 A Mute Reminder (2010)
 The Holiday Experience (2011)
 The Irish Experience (2013)
 Rock N' Roll Gangstas (2014)
 Phil Kominski:  Songs I Wrote and Recorded with Lloyd Dobler Effect, Remixed, Remastered and Unreleased (2020)

Related Albums
 Elizabeth Coyle - Landscape of the Heart (2001)
 Lionize - Mummies Wrapped In Money (2005)
 Elizabeth, Phil & Chris - Live at Jammin' Java (2007)
 Elizabeth, Phil & Chris - Seasons (2009)
 Elizabeth Coyle Kominski - Songs From the First Several Years (2020)
 Phil Kominski (2020)
 The Breakaways single "All Those Yesterdays" (2021)
 The Breakaways single "Eleanor Rigby" (2021)
 The Breakaways single "Voices" (2021)
 The Breakaways single "Tomorrow Never Knows" (2021)
 The Breakaways single "Silver Bells" (2021)
 The Breakaways single "Auld Lang Sine" (2021)
 The Breakaways single "Taps" (2021)
 Phil Kominski single "Fragile" (2021)

Related Singles
 Gad Romann - Can't Find Jenny (2005)
 Gad Romann - Gravity (2005)
 Gad Romann - Page Six (2005)
 Gad Romann - Sandra Dee (2005)
 Gad Romann - 1-800-Cheapseats.com (2005)

References

External links
 The Breakaways Official Website
 Phil Kominski Official Website
 Capital Effect Official Website

Rock music groups from Maryland
Musical groups established in 1995